Elachista miscanthi is a moth of the family Elachistidae. It is found in the Japanese island of Honshu and Kyushu and in Taiwan.

The length of the forewings is 2.9-3.1 mm for males and 3-3.5 mm for females. The forewings are black-brownish with silvery markings.

The larvae feed on Miscanthus sinensis. They mine the leaves of their host plant. The mine is full-depth and straight-linear. Pupation takes place outside of the mine.

References

Moths described in 1983
miscanthi
Moths of Asia